Markus Vogt (born 25 September 1965, in Munich) is a German rower. He finished 4th in the coxless four at the 1992 Summer Olympics.

References
 
 

1965 births
Living people
German male rowers
Sportspeople from Munich
Rowers at the 1992 Summer Olympics
Olympic rowers of Germany
World Rowing Championships medalists for Germany